Michael "Mike" Zavala Harley Kainga (born 28 January 1991) is a New Zealand rugby union player who last played for the Bay of Plenty Steamers in the ITM Cup. He signed for Taranaki to play in the 2016 Mitre 10 Cup. His position of choice is prop.

His impressive domestic performances for Bay of Plenty saw him named in the  Wider Training Squad for the 2013 Super Rugby season. He made three appearances for the franchise.

He was called into the Hurricanes Wider Training Squad in 2016, he then gained 4 caps including playing in the 2016 Super Rugby season final.

Kainga was a member of the New Zealand Under 20 side which won the 2011 IRB Junior World Championship. He played in 4 games during the tournament, 1 start and 3 substitute appearances.

References

External links
Mike Kainga itsrugby.co.uk Player Statistics

1991 births
New Zealand rugby union players
New Zealand Māori rugby union players
Bay of Plenty rugby union players
Chiefs (rugby union) players
Māori All Blacks players
Rugby union props
Living people
Hurricanes (rugby union) players
Taranaki rugby union players
Rugby union players from the Hawke's Bay Region